Alfred is a census-designated place (CDP) and the primary village in the town of Alfred, York County, Maine, United States. U.S. Route 202 passes through the village, leading northeast  to Gorham and southwest through Sanford  to Rochester, New Hampshire. Maine State Route 4 leads south  to North Berwick and leads north out of town with US 202. State Route 111 leads east from Alfred to Biddeford.

The Middle Branch Mousam River flows through the western and southern parts of the CDP, and the Littlefield River, a tributary of the Middle Branch, forms the eastern edge. The Mousam River flows southeast to the Atlantic Ocean at Kennebunk Beach, Maine.

Alfred was first listed as a CDP in 2013.

Demographics

References 

Census-designated places in York County, Maine
Census-designated places in Maine
Alfred, Maine